Suspiria is the second album by Miranda Sex Garden, released in 1993. It saw them moving further into the sounds of darkwave and gothic rock.

The LP edition contains a slightly different track list from the CD and cassette versions, and does not include the band's rendition of the Richard Rodgers and Lorenz Hart song "My Funny Valentine." Instead, it closes with an a cappella version of "Feed."

Production
Unlike the debut, Suspiria was recorded with a drummer and a keyboardist/guitarist.

Critical reception
AllMusic wrote that "the group's vocal style is more pungent and aggressive, with the heretofore dulcet tones of the group now transformed into wild, banshee-like shrieks and snarls." Trouser Press wrote: "Reconfiguring itself for each song, MSG shifts comfortably between string-driven rock and more exotic mixtures, allowing the three soaring sopranos ... to dominate regardless."

Track listing
"Ardera Sempre" – 4:52
"Open Eyes" – 6:30
"Sunshine" – 5:28
"Distance" – 3:22
"Play" – 4:16
"In Heaven" – 4:05
"Bring Down the Sky" – 7:35
"Feed" – 5:56
"Inferno" – 7:55
"Willie Biddle and his Waltzing Maggot" – 3:33
"My Funny Valentine" – 5:26

References

Miranda Sex Garden albums
1993 albums
Albums produced by Paul Kendall
Mute Records albums